Mads Hauge (born 10 February 1977) is a Norwegian songwriter and producer from Bergen, Norway. He has written the Natasha Bedingfield hit Soulmate and various songs for Pixie Lott including Cry Me Out, Kiss the Stars and UK #1s Mama Do and Boys and Girls. He has also written for other artists, including the Eliza Doolittle song Go Home and the Darren Hayes song Nearly Love.

References

Norwegian songwriters
Living people
1977 births